Fischbach may refer to Fischbach (surname), or to the following places:

Places

Austria
Fischbach, Styria, in the Weiz district
Fischbach (Texingtal), part of the municipality Texingtal, Lower Austria

Germany

Rhineland-Palatinate
Fischbach bei Dahn, part of the Verbandsgemeinde Dahner Felsenland, in the Südwestpfalz district
Fischbach, Birkenfeld, part of the Verbandsgemeinde Herrstein, in the Birkenfeld district
Fischbach, Kaiserslautern, part of the Verbandsgemeinde Hochspeyer, in the Kaiserslautern district
Fischbach-Oberraden, part of the Verbandsgemeinde Neuerburg, in the Bitburg-Prüm district

Hesse
Fischbach (Taunus), in the Main-Taunus district,
Fischbach, a part of Alsfeld, in the Vogelsbergkreis district
Fischbach, a part of Hauneck, in the Hersfeld-Rotenburg district

Thuringia
Fischbach/Rhön, in Wartburgkreis
Fischbach bei Gotha
Fischbach bei Bad Salzungen

Baden-Württemberg
Fischbach, a part of Schluchsee, in the Breisgau-Hochschwarzwald district
Fischbach, a part of Ummendorf, in the Biberach district

Saarland
Fischbach, a part of Quierschied, in Regionalverband Saarbrücken

Bavaria
Fischbach, a part of Nuremberg

Luxembourg
Fischbach, Mersch, a commune in Mersch canton
Fischbach, Heinerscheid, a town in the commune of Heinerscheid, in Clervaux canton

Switzerland
Fischbach, Lucerne, in the Canton of Lucerne
Fischbach-Göslikon, in the Canton of Aargau
Fischbach, an old commune before amalgamating into Fischbach-Göslikon in 1798

Rivers

Germany

Baden-Württemberg
Fischbach (Eschach)
Fischbach (Seckach)

Bavaria
Fischbach (Linder), tributary of the Linder
Fischbach (Pegnitz), tributary of the Goldbach which discharges into the Pegnitz
Fischbach (Weiße Traun), tributary of the Weiße Traun

Hesse
Fischbach (Gersprenz)

North Rhine-Westphalia
Fischbach (Asdorf)